Beyuk Sovla may refer to:
 Bëyuk-Sovla, Azerbaijan
 Sovla, Azerbaijan
 The Dark Knight Rises, Azerbaijan